Gerard Adams (born 6 October 1948) is an Irish republican politician who was the president of Sinn Féin between 13 November 1983 and 10 February 2018, and served as a Teachta Dála (TD) for Louth from 2011 to 2020. From 1983 to 1992 and from 1997 to 2011, he followed the policy of abstentionism as a Member of Parliament (MP) of the British Parliament for the Belfast West constituency.

Adams first became involved in Irish republicanism in the late 1960s, and had been an established figure in Irish activism for more than a decade before his 1983 election to Parliament. In 1984, Adams was seriously wounded in an assassination attempt by several gunmen from the Ulster Defence Association (UDA), including John Gregg. From the late 1980s onwards, he was an important figure in the Northern Ireland peace process, entering into talks initially with Social Democratic and Labour Party (SDLP) leader John Hume and then subsequently with the Irish and British governments. In 1986, he convinced Sinn Féin to change its traditional policy of abstentionism towards the Oireachtas, the parliament of the Republic of Ireland. In 1998, it also took seats in the power-sharing (D'Hondt method) Northern Ireland Assembly. In 2005, the Provisional Irish Republican Army (IRA) stated that its armed campaign was over and that it was exclusively committed to peaceful politics.

In 2014, Adams was held for four days by the Police Service of Northern Ireland for questioning in connection with the 1972 abduction and murder of Jean McConville. He was released without charge and a file was sent to the Public Prosecution Service for Northern Ireland, which later stated there was insufficient evidence to charge him. Adams announced in November 2017 that he would step down as leader of Sinn Féin in 2018, and that he would not stand for re-election to his seat in Dáil Éireann in 2020. He was succeeded by Mary Lou McDonald at a special ardfheis (party conference) on 10 February 2018.

Early life
Adams was born in the Ballymurphy district of Belfast on 6 October 1948. His parents, Anne (née Hannaway) and Gerry Adams Sr., came from republican backgrounds. His grandfather, also named Gerry Adams, was a member of the Irish Republican Brotherhood (IRB) during the Irish War of Independence. Two of his uncles, Dominic and Patrick Adams, had been interned by the governments in Belfast and Dublin. In J. Bowyer Bell's book The Secret Army, Bell states that Dominic was a senior figure in the IRA of the mid-1940s. Gerry Adams Sr. joined the IRA at age 16. In 1942, he participated in an IRA ambush on a Royal Ulster Constabulary (RUC) patrol but was himself shot, arrested and sentenced to eight years' imprisonment. Adams's maternal great-grandfather, Michael Hannaway, was also a member of the IRB during its bombing campaign in England in the 1860s and 1870s. Michael's son, Billy, was election agent for Éamon de Valera at the 1918 Irish general election in West Belfast. 

Adams attended St Finian's Primary School on Falls Road, where he was taught by La Salle brothers. Having passed the eleven-plus exam in 1960, he attended St Mary's Christian Brothers Grammar School. He left St Mary's with six O-levels and became a bartender. He was increasingly involved in the Irish republican movement, joining Sinn Féin and Fianna Éireann in 1964, after being radicalised by the Divis Street riots during that year's general election campaign.

Early political career

In the late 1960s, a civil rights campaign developed in Northern Ireland. Adams was an active supporter and joined the Northern Ireland Civil Rights Association in 1967. However, the civil rights movement was met with violence from loyalist counter-demonstrations and the RUC. In August 1969, the Northern Ireland riots resulted in violence in Belfast, Derry and elsewhere. British troops were called in at the request of the Government of Northern Ireland.

Adams was active in rioting at this time and later became involved in the republican movement. In August 1971, internment was reintroduced to Northern Ireland under the Special Powers Act 1922. Adams was captured by British soldiers in March 1972 and in a Belfast Telegraph report on Adams' capture he was said to be "one of the most wanted men in Belfast". The IRA negotiated a short-lived truce with the British government and an IRA delegation met with British Home Secretary William Whitelaw at Cheyne Walk in Chelsea. The delegation included Adams, Martin McGuinness, Sean Mac Stiofain (IRA Chief of Staff), Daithi O'Conaill, Seamus Twomey, Ivor Bell and Dublin solicitor Myles Shevlin. Adams was re-arrested in July 1973 and interned at the Maze prison. After taking part in an IRA-organised escape attempt, he was sentenced to a period of imprisonment. During this time, he wrote articles in the paper An Phoblacht under the by-line "Brownie", where he criticised the strategy and policy of Sinn Féin president Ruairí Ó Brádaigh and Billy McKee, the IRA's officer commanding in Belfast. He was also highly critical of a decision taken by McKee to assassinate members of the rival Official IRA, who had been on ceasefire since 1972. In 2020, the UK Supreme Court quashed Adams' convictions for attempting to escape on Christmas Eve in 1973 and again in July 1974.

During the 1981 hunger strike, which saw the emergence of his party as a political force, Adams played an important policy-making role. In 1983, he was elected president of Sinn Féin and became the first Sinn Féin MP elected to the British House of Commons since Phil Clarke and Tom Mitchell in the mid-1950s. Following his election as MP for Belfast West, the British government lifted a ban on his travelling to Great Britain. In line with Sinn Féin policy, he refused to take his seat in the House of Commons.

On 14 March 1984 in central Belfast, Adams was seriously wounded in an assassination attempt when several Ulster Defence Association (UDA) gunmen fired about 20 shots into the car in which he was travelling. He was hit in the neck, shoulder and arm. He was rushed to the Royal Victoria Hospital, where he underwent surgery to remove three bullets. John Gregg and his team were apprehended almost immediately by a British Army patrol that opened fire on them before ramming their car. The attack had been known in advance by security forces due to a tip-off from informants within the UDA; Adams and his co-passengers had survived in part because RUC officers, acting on the informants' information, had replaced much of the ammunition in the UDA's Rathcoole weapons dump with low-velocity bullets. Some, including Adams himself, still have unanswered questions about the RUC’s actions prior to the shooting.  An Ulster Defence Regiment NCO subsequently received the Queen's Gallantry Medal for chasing and arresting an assailant.

IRA membership allegations
Adams has stated repeatedly that he has never been a member of the Provisional Irish Republican Army (IRA). However, journalists such as Ed Moloney, Peter Taylor and Mark Urban, and historian Richard English have all named Adams as part of the IRA leadership since the 1970s. Additionally, former IRA members Dolours Price and Brendan Hughes both independently stated that they served under Adams in the IRA, although Adams has continued to deny all such allegations.

Moloney and Taylor state Adams became the IRA's Chief of Staff following the arrest of Seamus Twomey in early December 1977, remaining in the position until 18 February 1978 when he, along with twenty other republican suspects, was arrested following the La Mon restaurant bombing. He was charged with IRA membership and remanded to Crumlin Road Gaol. He was released seven months later when the Lord Chief Justice of Northern Ireland Robert Lowry ruled there was insufficient evidence to proceed with the prosecution. Moloney and English state Adams had been a member of the IRA Army Council since 1977, remaining a member until 2005 according to Irish Minister for Justice, Equality and Law Reform Michael McDowell.

2014 arrest
On 30 April 2014, Adams was arrested by detectives from the Police Service of Northern Ireland (PSNI) Serious Crime Branch, under the Terrorism Act 2000, in connection with the murder of Jean McConville in 1972. He had previously voluntarily arranged to be interviewed by police regarding the matter, and maintained he had no involvement. Fellow Sinn Féin politician Alex Maskey claimed that the timing of the arrest, "three weeks into an election", was evidence of a "political agenda [...] a negative agenda" by the PSNI. Jean McConville's family had campaigned for the arrest of Adams over the murder. Jean McConville's son Michael said that his family did not think the arrest of Adams would ever happen, but were "quite glad" that the arrest took place. Adams was released without charge after four days in custody and it was decided to send a file to the Public Prosecution Service, which would decide if criminal charges should be brought.

At a press conference after his release, Adams also criticised the timing of his arrest, while reiterating Sinn Féin's support for the PSNI and saying: "The IRA is gone. It is finished". Adams has denied that he had any involvement in the murder or was ever a member of the IRA, and has said the allegations against him came from "enemies of the peace process". On 29 September 2015 the Public Prosecution Service announced Adams would not face charges, due to insufficient evidence, as had been expected ever since a BBC report dated 6 May 2014 (2 days after the BBC reported his release), which was widely repeated elsewhere.

Rise in Sinn Féin

In 1978, Adams became joint vice-president of Sinn Féin and a key figure in directing a challenge to the Sinn Féin leadership of President Ruairí Ó Brádaigh and joint vice-president Dáithí Ó Conaill. The 1975 IRA-British truce is often viewed as the event that began the challenge to the original Provisional Sinn Féin leadership, which was dominated by southerners like Ó Brádaigh and Ó Conaill.

One of the reasons that the Provisional IRA and Provisional Sinn Féin were founded, in December 1969 and January 1970, respectively, was that people like Ó Brádaigh, Ó Conaill and McKee opposed participation in constitutional politics. The other reason was the failure of the Cathal Goulding leadership to provide for the defence of Irish nationalist areas during the 1969 Northern Ireland riots. When, at the December 1969 IRA convention and the January 1970 Sinn Féin Ard Fheis, the delegates voted to participate in the Dublin (Leinster House), Belfast (Stormont) and London (Westminster) parliaments, the organisations split. Adams, who had joined the republican movement in the early 1960s, sided with the Provisionals.

In the Maze prison in the mid-1970s, writing under the pseudonym "Brownie" in Republican News, Adams called for increased political activity among republicans, especially at local level. The call resonated with younger Northern people, many of whom had been active in the Provisional IRA but few of whom had been active in Sinn Féin. In 1977, Adams and Danny Morrison drafted the address of Jimmy Drumm at the annual Wolfe Tone commemoration at Bodenstown. The address was viewed as watershed in that Drumm acknowledged that the war would be a long one and that success depended on political activity that would complement the IRA's armed campaign. For some, this wedding of politics and armed struggle culminated in Danny Morrison's statement at the 1981 Sinn Féin Ard Fheis in which he asked "Who here really believes we can win the war through the ballot box? But will anyone here object if, with a ballot paper in one hand and the Armalite in the other, we take power in Ireland?" For others, however, the call to link political activity with armed struggle had already been defined in Sinn Féin policy and in the presidential addresses of Ruairí Ó Brádaigh, but this had not resonated with young Northerners.

Even after the election of Bobby Sands as MP for Fermanagh and South Tyrone, a part of the mass mobilisation associated with the 1981 Irish Hunger Strike by republican prisoners in the H blocks of the Maze Prison (known as Long Kesh by republicans), Adams was cautious that the level of political involvement by Sinn Féin could lead to electoral embarrassment. Charles Haughey, the Taoiseach of the Republic of Ireland, called an election for June 1981. At an Ard Chomhairle meeting, Adams recommended that they contest only four constituencies which were in border counties. Instead, H-Block/Armagh candidates contested nine constituencies and elected two TDs. This, along with the election of Sands, was a precursor to an electoral breakthrough in elections in 1982 to the 1982 Northern Ireland Assembly. Adams, Danny Morrison, Martin McGuinness, Jim McAllister and Owen Carron were elected as abstentionists. The Social Democratic and Labour Party (SDLP) had announced before the election that it would not take any seats and so its 14 elected representatives also abstained from participating in the Assembly and it was a failure. The 1982 election was followed by the 1983 Westminster election, in which Sinn Féin's vote increased and Adams was elected, as an abstentionist, as MP for Belfast West. It was in 1983 that Ruairí Ó Brádaigh resigned as President of Sinn Féin and was succeeded by Adams.

President of Sinn Féin
Many republicans had long claimed that the only legitimate Irish state was the Irish Republic declared in the 1916 Proclamation of the Republic. In their view, the legitimate government was the IRA Army Council, which had been vested with the authority of that Republic in 1938 (prior to the Second World War) by the last remaining anti-Treaty deputies of the Second Dáil. In his 2005 speech to the Sinn Féin Ard Fheis in Dublin, Adams explicitly rejected this view. "But we refuse to criminalise those who break the law in pursuit of legitimate political objectives. ... Sinn Féin is accused of recognising the Army Council of the IRA as the legitimate government of this island. That is not the case. [We] do not believe that the Army Council is the government of Ireland. Such a government will only exist when all the people of this island elect it. Does Sinn Féin accept the institutions of this state as the legitimate institutions of this state? Of course we do."

As a result of this non-recognition, Sinn Féin had abstained from taking any of the seats they won in the British or Irish parliaments. At its 1986 Ard Fheis, Sinn Féin delegates passed a resolution to amend the rules and constitution that would allow its members to sit in the Dublin parliament. At this, Ruairí Ó Brádaigh led a small walkout, just as he and Sean Mac Stiofain had done sixteen years earlier with the creation of Provisional Sinn Féin. This minority, which rejected dropping the policy of abstentionism, now distinguishes itself from Sinn Féin by using the name Republican Sinn Féin (or Sinn Féin Poblachtach), and maintains that they are the true Sinn Féin.

Adams' leadership of Sinn Féin was supported by a Northern-based cadre that included people like Danny Morrison and Martin McGuinness. Over time, Adams and others pointed to republican electoral successes in the early and mid-1980s, when hunger strikers Bobby Sands and Kieran Doherty were elected to the British House of Commons and Dáil Éireann respectively, and they advocated that Sinn Féin become increasingly political and base its influence on electoral politics rather than paramilitarism. The electoral effects of this strategy were shown later by the election of Adams and McGuinness to the House of Commons.

Voice ban
Adams's prominence as an Irish republican leader was increased by the 1988–1994 British broadcasting voice restrictions, which were imposed by British Prime Minister Margaret Thatcher to "starve the terrorist and the hijacker of the oxygen of publicity on which they depend".<ref>Edgerton, Gary Quelling the "Oxygen of Publicity": British Broadcasting and "The Troubles" During the Thatcher Years, The Journal of Popular Culture, Volume 30, Issue 1, pp. 115–32.</ref> Thatcher was moved to act after BBC interviews of Martin McGuinness and Adams had been the focus of a row over an edition of After Dark, a proposed Channel 4 discussion programme which in the event was never made. While the ban covered 11 Irish political parties and paramilitary organisations, in practice it mostly affected Sinn Féin, the most prominent of these bodies.

A similar ban, known as Section 31, had been law in the Republic of Ireland since the 1970s. However, media outlets soon found ways around the bans. In the UK, this was initially by the use of subtitles, but later and more often by an actor reading words accompanied by video footage of the banned person speaking. Actors who voiced Adams included Stephen Rea and Paul Loughran. This loophole could not be used in the Republic, as word-for-word broadcasts were not allowed. Instead, the banned speaker's words were summarised by the newsreader, over video of them speaking.

These bans were lampooned in cartoons and satirical TV shows, such as Spitting Image, and in The Day Today, and were criticised by freedom of speech organisations and media personalities, including BBC Director General John Birt and BBC foreign editor John Simpson. The Republic's ban was allowed to lapse in January 1994, and the British ban was lifted by Prime Minister John Major in September 1994.

Movement into mainstream politics

Sinn Féin continued its policy of refusing to sit in the Westminster Parliament after Adams won the Belfast West constituency. He lost his seat to Joe Hendron of the SDLP in the 1992 general election, regaining it at the following 1997 election. Under Adams, Sinn Féin moved away from being a political voice of the Provisional IRA to becoming a professionally organised political party in both Northern Ireland and the Republic of Ireland.

SDLP leader John Hume identified the possibility that a negotiated settlement might be possible and began secret talks with Adams in 1988. These discussions led to unofficial contacts with the British Northern Ireland Office under the Secretary of State for Northern Ireland, Peter Brooke, and with the government of the Republic under Charles Haughey – although both governments maintained in public that they would not negotiate with terrorists. These talks provided the groundwork for what was later to be the Belfast Agreement, preceded by the milestone Downing Street Declaration and the Joint Framework Document.

These negotiations led to the IRA ceasefire in August 1994. Taoiseach Albert Reynolds, who had replaced Haughey and who had played a key role in the Hume/Adams dialogue through his Special Advisor Martin Mansergh, regarded the ceasefire as permanent. However, the slow pace of developments contributed in part to the (wider) political difficulties of the British government of John Major. His consequent reliance on Ulster Unionist Party (UUP) votes in the House of Commons led to him agreeing with the UUP demand to exclude Sinn Féin from talks until the IRA had decommissioned its weapons. Sinn Féin's exclusion led the IRA to end its ceasefire and resume its campaign.

After the 1997 United Kingdom general election, the new Labour government had a majority in the House of Commons and was not reliant on unionist votes. The subsequent dropping of the insistence led to another IRA ceasefire, as part of the negotiations strategy, which saw teams from the British and Irish governments, the UUP, the SDLP, Sinn Féin, and representatives of loyalist paramilitary organisations, under the chairmanship of former United States Senator George Mitchell, produce the Good Friday Agreement in 1998. Under the Agreement, structures were created reflecting the Irish and British identities of the people of Ireland, creating a British-Irish Council and a Northern Ireland Legislative Assembly.

Articles 2 and 3 of the Republic's constitution, which claimed sovereignty over all of Ireland, were reworded, and a power-sharing Executive Committee was provided for. As part of their deal, Sinn Féin agreed to abandon its abstentionist policy regarding a "six-county parliament", as a result taking seats in the new Stormont-based Assembly and running the education and health and social services ministries in the power-sharing government.

Sinn Féin in government

On 15 August 1998, four months after the signing of the Good Friday Agreement, the Omagh bombing by the Real IRA, killed 29 people and injured 220, from many communities. Adams said in reaction to the bombing "I am totally horrified by this action. I condemn it without any equivocation whatsoever." Prior to this, Adams had not used the word "condemn" in relation to IRA or their splinter groups' actions.

When Sinn Féin came to nominate its two ministers to the Northern Ireland Executive, for tactical reasons the party, like the SDLP and the DUP, chose not to include its leader among its ministers. When later the SDLP chose a new leader, it selected one of its ministers, Mark Durkan, who then opted to remain in the committee.

Adams was re-elected to the Northern Ireland Assembly on 8 March 2007, and on 26 March 2007, he met with DUP leader Ian Paisley face-to-face for the first time. These talks led to the St Andrews Agreement, which brought about the return of the power-sharing Executive in Northern Ireland.

In January 2009, Adams attended the United States presidential inauguration of Barack Obama as a guest of US Congressman Richard Neal.

Election to Dáil Éireann

On 6 May 2010, Adams was re-elected as MP for West Belfast, garnering 71.1% of the vote. In 2010, Adams announced that he would be seeking election as a TD (member of Irish Parliament) for the constituency of Louth at the 2011 Irish general election. He subsequently resigned his West Belfast Assembly seat on 7 December 2010.

Following the announcement of the 2011 Irish general election, Adams resigned his seat at the House of Commons. He was elected to the Dáil, topping the Louth constituency poll with 15,072 (21.7%) first preference votes. He succeeded Caoimhghín Ó Caoláin as Sinn Féin parliamentary leader in Dáil Éireann. In December 2013, Adams was a member of the Guard of Honour at Nelson Mandela's funeral.

On 19 May 2015, while on an official royal trip to Ireland, Prince Charles shook Adams' hand in what was described as a highly symbolic gesture of reconciliation. The meeting, described as "historic", took place in Galway.

In September 2017, Adams said he would allow his name to go forward for a one-year term as president of Sinn Féin at the November ardfheis, at which point Sinn Féin would begin a "planned process of generational change, including [Adams'] own future intentions". This resulted in speculation in the Irish and British media that Adams was preparing to stand down as party leader, and that he might run for President of Ireland in the next election. At the ardfheis on 18 November, Adams was re-elected for another year as party president, but announced that he would step down at some point in 2018, and would not seek re-election as TD for Louth.

End of Sinn Féin presidency

Adams' presidency of Sinn Féin ended on 10 February 2018, with his stepping down, and the election of Mary Lou McDonald as the party's new president.

On 13 July 2018, a home-made bomb was thrown at Adams' home in West Belfast, damaging a car parked in his driveway. Adams escaped injury and claimed that his two grandchildren were standing in the driveway only 10 minutes before the blast. Another bomb was set off that same evening at the nearby home of former IRA member and Sinn Féin official Bobby Storey. In a press conference the following day, Adams said he thought the attacks were linked to the riots in Derry, and asked that those responsible "come and sit down" and "give us the rationale for this action".

Personal life
In 1971, Adams married Collette McArdle. They have a son named Gearoid (born 1973), who has played Gaelic football for Antrim GAA senior men's team and became its assistant manager in 2012.

In October 2013, Adams' brother Liam was found guilty of 10 offences, including rape and gross indecency committed against his own daughter. When the allegations of abuse were first made public in a 2009 UTV programme, Gerry Adams subsequently alleged that his own father had subjected family members to emotional, physical, and sexual abuse.Adams reveals family history of abuse . RTÉ News and Current Affairs. Sunday, 20 December 2009. Audio interview also available from that page. On 27 November 2013, Liam was jailed for 16 years. He died of pancreatic cancer, aged 63, while in Maghaberry Prison, in February 2019.

Controversy
On 1 May 2016, Adams sparked controversy by tweeting, "Watching Django Unchained-A Ballymurphy Nigger!" The tweet was criticised and subsequently deleted, with Adams apologising for the use of "nigger" the next day at Sinn Féin's Connolly House headquarters in Belfast. The tweet was widely reported in Irish, British, and American media. Adams said, "I stand over the context and main point of my tweet, which were the parallels between people in struggle. Like African Americans, Irish nationalists were denied basic rights. I have long been inspired by Harriet Tubman, Frederick Douglass, Rosa Parks, Martin Luther King, and Malcolm X, who stood up for themselves and for justice." On 4 May, he said, "The whole thing was to make a political point. If I had left that word out, would the tweet have gotten any attention? ... I was paralleling the experiences of the Irish, not just in recent times but through the penal days when the Irish were sold as slaves, through the Cromwellian period." He was criticised for perpetuating what has been called the "Irish slaves myth", by equating the indentured servitude of the Irish with the chattel slavery of African Americans.

Media portrayals
Adams has been portrayed in a number of films, TV series, and books:
 1999 – The Marching Season, a spy fiction novel by Daniel Silva.
 2004 – film Omagh, with actor Jonathan Ryan, a dramatisation of the 1998 Omagh bombing and its aftermath.
 2010 – TV film Mo, with actor John Lynch, the story of Mo Mowlam and the Good Friday Agreement.
 2012 – The Cold Cold Ground, a crime novel by Adrian McKinty; Adams is interviewed by the book's main character after an associate is found murdered.
 2016 – film The Journey, with actor Ian Beattie.
 2017 – film The Foreigner, with actor Pierce Brosnan playing a former IRA leader who resembles Adams.

Published works
 Falls Memories, 1982
 The Politics of Irish Freedom, 1986
 A Pathway to Peace, 1988
 An Irish Voice: The Quest for Peace Cage Eleven, 1990, Brandon Books, 
 The Street and Other Stories, 1993, Brandon Books, 
 Free Ireland: Towards a Lasting Peace, 1995
 Before the Dawn: An Autobiography, 1996, Brandon Books, 
 Selected Writings Who Fears to Speak...?, 2001 (Original Edition 1991), Beyond the Pale Publications, 
 An Irish Journal, 2001, Brandon Books, 
 Hope and History: Making Peace in Ireland, 2003, Brandon Books, 
 A Farther Shore, 2005, Random House
 The New Ireland: A Vision For The Future, 2005, Brandon Books, 
 An Irish Eye, 2007, Brandon Books, 
 My Little Book of Tweets, 2016, Mercier Press, 

References

Further reading

 de Bréadún, Deaglán. "Gerry Adams – the face of Irish republicanism – hands over at Sinn Féin," WikiTribune, 22 January 2018.
 Keena, Colm. Biography of Gerry Adams. Cork: Mercier Press, 1990.
 Randolph, Jody Allen. "Gerry Adams, August 2009." Close to the Next Moment: Interviews from a Changing Ireland. Manchester: Carcanet, 2010.

External links

Léargas blog by Gerry Adams
Column archive at The GuardianGerry Adams  Sinn Féin profile

 

Gerry Adams Man Of War and Man Of Peace? Anthony McIntyre, The Blanket, 28 April 2004
Interview with Gerry Adams February 2006
Gerry Adams Profile at New Statesman''

|-

|-

|-

|-

|-

|-

|-

|-

1948 births
21st-century writers from Northern Ireland
Irish nationalists
Irish republicans
Irish republicans interned without trial
Leaders of Sinn Féin
Living people
Male non-fiction writers from Northern Ireland
Members of the 31st Dáil
Members of the 32nd Dáil
Members of the Northern Ireland Forum
Members of the Parliament of the United Kingdom for Belfast constituencies (since 1922)
Northern Ireland MPAs 1982–1986
Northern Ireland MLAs 1998–2003
Northern Ireland MLAs 2003–2007
Northern Ireland MLAs 2007–2011
People educated at St. Mary's Christian Brothers' Grammar School, Belfast
Politicians from Belfast
Shooting survivors
Socialists from Northern Ireland
Sinn Féin MLAs
Sinn Féin MPs (post-1921)
Sinn Féin TDs (post-1923)
UK MPs 1983–1987
UK MPs 1987–1992
UK MPs 1997–2001
UK MPs 2001–2005
UK MPs 2005–2010
UK MPs 2010–2015
Writers from Belfast
Victims of bomb threats